119th Brigade may refer to:
 119th Motorized Infantry Brigade (People's Republic of China)
 119th Brigade (Croatia)
 119th Brigade (United Kingdom)
 119th Helicopter Brigade, of Yugoslavia, and later Serbia